Manorisms is a 1977 album by Wet Willie and was released on the Epic Records label. The building on the cover is The Manor Studio in Shipton-on-Cherwell where much of the album was recorded. It contains the hit single, "Street Corner Serenade" (US Billboard #30).

Track listing
 "Rainman" (Mike Duke)
 "Make You Feel Love Again" (George Jackson, Thomas Jones)
 "So Blue" (Duke)
 "We Got Lovin'" (Duke, Jimmy Hall, Jack Hall)
 "Don't Turn Me Away" (Duke)
 "Street Corner Serenade" (Duke, Jimmy Hall, Marshall Smith)
 "One Track Mind" (Duke, Jimmy Hall)
 "How 'Bout You?" (Duke)
 "Doin' All the Right Things (The Wrong Way)" (Duke)
 "Let It Shine" (Duke, Hall, Hall, Smith)

Personnel
Jimmy Hall – saxophone, lead vocals, harmonica
Marshall Smith – guitar, backing vocals
Larry Berwald – guitar
Mike Duke – keyboards, lead vocals
Jack Hall – bass, backing vocals
Theophilus Lively – drums, backing vocals, percussion
Fiachra Trench – orchestration on "Don't Turn Me Away" and "Let It Shine"
Mick Glossop – engineer

Charts

References

1977 albums
Epic Records albums